The Manso River is a river in the Mato Grosso state of western Brazil. It is a tributary of the Cuiabá River, and is approximately 850 kilometers long.

The river is impounded by the Manso Dam in Rosário Oeste, Mato Grosso, creating a  reservoir to power a 92 MW hydroelectric power plant.

See also
List of rivers of Mato Grosso

References
Brazilian Ministry of Transport

Rivers of Mato Grosso